Harry G. Summers Jr. was a professional soldier and author.

Harry Summers may also refer to:

Other people
Harry Summers (runner), Australian distance runner and competitor in the men's 10,000 metres event at the 2014 Commonwealth Games
Harry Summers (racewalker), Australian racewalker and competitor at the 1985 IAAF World Race Walking Cup

Fictional characters
Harry Summers, character in Silver Spoons
Harry Summers, MSquad character played by Ron Hayes
Harry Summers, character in The Jackpot

See also
Henry Summers (disambiguation)
Harrison Summers (disambiguation)
Harry Somers (1925–1999), composer